Mysterio is a supervillain in the Marvel Comics Universe.
Mysterio may also refer to:
 Mysterio (album), 1992 alternative rock album by Ian McCulloch.
 El Hijo de Rey Misterio (born 1989), Mexican-American professional wrestler
 Rey Misterio (born 1958), Mexican professional wrestler
 Rey Mysterio (born 1974), Mexican-American professional wrestler

See also
 Misterio, a Mexican film
 Mysteria (disambiguation)
 Mysterion (disambiguation)